

List of Rulers of the Mahi state of Fitta

Sources
 http://www.rulers.org/benitrad.html

See also
Benin
Mahi states
Lists of office-holders

Mahi